The John Coumbe Farmstead, also known as Tippesaukee Farm, was listed on the National Register of Historic Places originally in 1992. Its  area included five contributing buildings. The listing area was increased and the listing was renamed Tippesaukee Farm Rural Historic District in 1996. The increase was a  area including three contributing sites.

The property has a rock with embedded historic plaque noting that on this site in 1838 John Coumbe (1808-1882), of Devonshire, became the first white settler in Richland County.

References

Farms on the National Register of Historic Places in Wisconsin
Geography of Richland County, Wisconsin
Historic districts on the National Register of Historic Places in Wisconsin
National Register of Historic Places in Richland County, Wisconsin